Oxycheilinus mentalis (mental wrasse) is a species of wrasse found in the Western Indian Ocean, in the Red Sea and Gulf of Aden.

It has been known to change its colouration to match species of non-predatory parrotfish and surgeonfish. It then swims with these harmless model species and predates upon passing fish. This is a form of aggressive mimicry. Without a model fish, the mental wrasse has a reddish pink colour.

References

mentalis
Fish described in 1828